Dr. Jagadisan Mohandas Kumarappa (1886–1957) was an Indian author and parliamentarian. He was nominated to the Rajya Sabha in 1952 and served till 1954. Born on April 16, 1886, he was the son of Shri S.D. Cornelius; and Shrimati Esther Rajanayagam. His wife Rathnam Appasamy was the daughter of well known lawyer Dewan Bahadur A.S. Appasamy . He was Member of the Rajya Sabha, from 3 April 1952 to 2 April 1954; Author of a few books; Died on 18 November 1957. He did his B.A. (Ohio) and M.A. (Harvard), S.T.B. (Boston), M.A., Ph.D., (Columbia).

Sources
Brief Biodata
Former Directors of Tata Institute of Social Sciences

1886 births
1957 deaths
Nominated members of the Rajya Sabha
Ohio University alumni
Boston University alumni
Columbia University alumni
Harvard University alumni